Constantin Năsturescu (2 October 1940 – 10 December 2021) was a Romanian professional footballer who played as a midfielder.

Club career
Constantin Năsturescu, nicknamed Bebe was born on 2 October 1940 in Giurgiu, Romania and started to play junior level football in 1952 at local club Dunărea, starting his senior career in 1961 at CFR Roșiori in Divizia B. He was transferred at Rapid București where on 8 April 1962 he made his Divizia A debut under coach Ion Mihăilescu in a 3–1 away loss against Steagul Roșu Brașov. He spent 13 seasons at Rapid in which he helped the club win the 1966–67 Divizia A which was the first title in the club's history, being used by coach Valentin Stănescu in 25 matches in which he scored three goals. He also won the 1971–72 Cupa României, and two Balkans Cup in 1964 and 1966. Năsturescu played 20 games and scored two goals in European competitions (including 4 games and two goals in the Inter-cities Fairs Cup), taking part in the 1971–72 UEFA Cup campaign, playing all six games as the team reached the eight-finals, eliminating Napoli and Legia Warsaw, being eliminated by the team who would eventually win the competition, Tottenham and took part in the 1972–73 European Cup Winners' Cup campaign, playing all six games, helping the team reach the quarter-finals, eliminating Landskrona BoIS against whom he scored a goal and Rapid Wien, being eliminated by Leeds United who reached the final. He made his last Divizia A appearance on 19 June 1974 in a 1–0 away loss against Politehnica Iași, having a total of 288 appearances and 25 goals scored in the competition, retiring after playing two more seasons at Progresul Brăila and Unirea Focșani in Divizia B. Constantin Năsturescu died on 10 December 2021 at age 81.

International career
Constantin Năsturescu played three matches for Romania, making his debut under coach Bazil Marian on 4 January 1967 in a 1–1 friendly against Uruguay, which took place in Montevideo on Estadio Gran Parque Central. His following games were also friendlies, a 0–0 against Poland and a 1–0 loss against France. He also played three games for Romania's Olympic team.

Honours
Rapid București
Divizia A: 1966–67
Cupa României: 1971–72
Balkans Cup: 1963–64, 1964–66

Notes

References

1940 births
2021 deaths
People from Giurgiu
Romanian footballers
Association football midfielders
Romania international footballers
Olympic footballers of Romania
Liga I players
Liga II players
FC Rapid București players
AFC Dacia Unirea Brăila players
CSM Focșani players